The Arrival is the ninth studio album by Swedish death metal band Hypocrisy, released on 16 February 2004. It is the last album with their longtime drummer Lars Szöke. The song "Eraser" was made into a music video. The album was also released in a strictly limited boxset, containing "The Arrival", eight postcards and a bonus DVD of Hypocrisy's complete live show at Summer Breeze Festival in 2002.

Dan Swanö (tracks 1, 3, 4, 7–9) and Silenoz (track 5) wrote lyrics for the album. The band wrote lyrics for track 2 and Tägtgren also wrote lyrics for tracks 4–6.

Track listing

Personnel

Hypocrisy 
Peter Tägtgren − vocals, guitar, keyboards
Lars Szöke − drums
Michael Hedlund − bass guitar, fretless bass on intro of "Eraser"

Production 
Produced by Peter Tägtgren and Michael Hedlund
Mixed by Peter Tägtgren
Mastered in Cutting Room Studios by Björn Engelmann

Charts

References 

2004 albums
Hypocrisy (band) albums
Nuclear Blast albums
Albums produced by Peter Tägtgren